Hamilton is a former New Zealand parliamentary electorate that existed from 1922 to 1969. The electorate covered the urban area of the city of Hamilton. For the 1972 election, the nature of Hamilton East changed to urban, and the  electorate complements it to form a second urban electorate.

Five members of parliament have served the Hamilton electorate over its 47 years of existence. Two of them died in office, and both deaths caused by-elections.

Population centres
In the 1922 electoral redistribution, the North Island gained one electorate from the South Island due to faster population growth. The  electorate was abolished, and the Hamilton electorate was created for the first time. For the purposes of the country quota, the initial electorate was classed as two thirds urban and one third rural, and covered the city of Hamilton.

Through an amendment in the Electoral Act in 1965, the number of electorates in the South Island was fixed at 25, an increase of one since the 1962 electoral redistribution. It was accepted that through the more rapid population growth in the North Island, the number of its electorates would continue to increase, and to keep proportionality, three new electorates were allowed for in the 1967 electoral redistribution for the next election. In the North Island, five electorates were newly created and one electorate was reconstituted while three electorates were abolished (including Hamilton). In the South Island, three electorates were newly created and one electorate was reconstituted while three electorates were abolished. The overall effect of the required changes was highly disruptive to existing electorates, with all but three electorates having their boundaries altered.

History
The electorate's first representative was Alexander Young of the Reform Party, who had since the  represented the  electorate, but chose to stand in the new electorate in 1922 instead.

Adams-Schneider served until the end of the term in 1969, when the electorate was abolished.

The 1967 electoral redistribution created a new electorate called  electorate. Its eastern boundary was the Waikato River, but it incorporated much of the former  electorate, extended to the Tasman Sea, and was thus more rural in nature.

Members of Parliament
Key

Election results

1966 election

1963 election

1960 election

1959 by-election

1957 election

1954 election

1951 election

1949 election

1946 election

1945 by-election

1943 election

 
 
 

 
 

 

Table footnotes:

1938 election

1935 election

1931 election

1928 election

Notes

References

Historical electorates of New Zealand
Politics of Hamilton, New Zealand
1922 establishments in New Zealand
1969 disestablishments in New Zealand